Albert James Pepperell (first ¼ 1922 – 1986) was an English professional rugby league footballer who played in the 1940s and 1950s.

Background
Albert Pepperell's birth was registered in Seaton district, Cumberland, England, he was a fitter at the Distington Engineering Company (Chapel Bank), Workington, and he died aged 63–64.

Playing career

International honours
Albert Pepperell won a cap for British Empire XIII while at Workington in 1952 against New Zealand, and won caps for Great Britain while at Workington in 1950 against New Zealand, and in 1951 against New Zealand.

County honours
Albert Pepperell represented Cumberland. Albert Pepperell played  in Cumberland's 5-4 victory over Australia in the 1948–49 Kangaroo tour of Great Britain and France match at the Recreation Ground, Whitehaven on Wednesday 13 October 1948, in front of a crowd of 8,818.

Challenge Cup Final appearances
Albert Pepperell played  in Workington Town's 18-10 victory over Featherstone Rovers in the 1952 Challenge Cup Final during the 1951–52 season at Wembley Stadium, London on Saturday 19 April 1952, in front of a crowd of 72,093.

Testimonial match
Albert Pepperell's Testimonial match at Workington Town took place in 1955.

Genealogical Information
Albert Pepperell's marriage to Josephine B. (née Charnley) was registered during third ¼ 1954 in Cockermouth district. They had children; Diane E. Pepperell (birth registered during fourth ¼  in Whitehaven district). Albert Pepperell was the younger brother of the rugby league footballers, Stanley Pepperell and Russell Pepperell.

References

External links
!Great Britain Statistics at englandrl.co.uk (statistics currently missing due to not having appeared for both Great Britain, and England)

1922 births
1986 deaths
British Empire rugby league team players
Cumberland rugby league team players
English rugby league players
Great Britain national rugby league team players
Huddersfield Giants players
Rugby league halfbacks
Rugby league players from Seaton, Cumbria
Workington Town players